Lana Parrilla (born July 15, 1977) is an American actress. She was a regular cast member in the fifth season of the ABC sitcom Spin City (2000–2001) and in the fourth season of 24 (2005), and starred in Boomtown (2002–2003), Windfall (2006), Swingtown (2008), and as Dr. Eva Zambrano in the short-lived medical drama Miami Medical (2010), and as The Evil Queen / Regina Mills in the ABC fantasy drama series Once Upon a Time (2011–2018). Among her awards and nominations is a 2012 ALMA Award win for Outstanding TV Actress - Drama. In 2021, she played the role of Rita Castillo in the second season of Why Women Kill.

Early life
Parrilla was born in the Brooklyn borough of New York City on July 15, 1977. Her mother, Dolores Dee Azzara, is of Sicilian ancestry (Villabate) and her father, Sam Parrilla, is a Puerto Rico-born baseball player who played one season with the Philadelphia Phillies. She is also the niece of Candice Azzara, an American Broadway and TV actress.

She grew up in Boerum Hill and graduated from Fort Hamilton High School in Bay Ridge.

Lana studied acting at the Beverly Hills Playhouse in Los Angeles.

Career

1999–2010
In her early career, Parrilla appeared in several movies, including Very Mean Men (2000), Spiders (2000), and Frozen Stars (2003). She made her television debut in 1999, on the UPN sitcom Grown Ups. In 2000, she joined the cast of the ABC comedy series Spin City, playing Angie Ordonez for one season. She left the show in 2001. After that she joined Donnie Wahlberg and Neal McDonough in the short lived crime drama Boomtown, for which she received the Imagen Award for Best Supporting Actress, for her portrayal of Teresa, a paramedic. Initially a success, Boomtown began to struggle, and Parrilla's character became a police academy rookie, to tie her more closely to the rest of the show. "Boomtown" was canceled just two episodes into its second season.

Parrilla guest-starred in a number of television dramas, including JAG, Six Feet Under, Covert Affairs, Medium, The Defenders and Chase. She had a recurring role in 2004 as Officer Janet Grafton in NYPD Blue. In 2005, Parrilla took a recurring guest role on the fourth season of the Fox series 24 as Sarah Gavin, a Counter Terrorist Unit agent; she was made a regular cast member in the seventh episode, and her character was written out after the twelfth episode.

In 2006, Parrilla starred in the NBC summer series Windfall alongside former Boomtown castmate Jason Gedrick. In 2007, she guest starred as Greta during the third season of ABC's Lost in the episodes "Greatest Hits" and "Through the Looking Glass" In 2008, she had a leading role in the Lifetime film The Double Life of Eleanor Kendall, in which she played Nellie, a divorcee whose identity has been stolen. Also in 2008, she starred in the CBS summer series Swingtown as Trina Decker, a woman who is part of a swinging couple. In 2010, Parrilla had a female lead role in the Jerry Bruckheimer-produced Miami Medical on CBS, which had a short run towards the end of the 2009–10 television season before it was canceled in July 2010. Windfall, Swingtown and Miami Medical were all canceled after 13 episodes.

2011–present

In February 2011, she was cast as Mayor Regina Mills/The Evil Queen, in the ABC adventure fantasy drama Once Upon a Time, created by Edward Kitsis and Adam Horowitz. The series debuted in October 2011. The pilot episode was watched by 12.93 million viewers and achieved an adult 18–49 rating/share of 4.0/10 during the first season, receiving generally favorable reviews from critics. Parrilla's performance also received positive reviews from critics. In 2012 and 2013, she was regarded as a promising contender for an Emmy Award in the Outstanding Supporting Actress in a Drama Series category, though she did not receive a nomination. She won the TV Guide Award for Favorite Villain and the ALMA Award for Outstanding Actress in a Drama Series in 2012. Parrilla also received a nomination for Best Supporting Actress on Television from the 38th Saturn Awards.

On April 30, 2021, Parrilla released a song with Leonardo Abbate, who goes by the stage name Glovibes, called "It's Over Now". It is a remix and rearrangement of Deborah Cox's 1998 song of the same name. 

In 2022, Parilla was cast opposite Jennifer Lopez in the Netflix sci-fi thriller film Atlas. Later that year, she was cast for the second season of Netflix legal drama series, The Lincoln Lawyer.

Personal life
Parrilla became engaged to Alfredo Di Blasio on April 28, 2013, while traveling in Israel. They were married on July 5, 2014, in British Columbia. In April 2019 Parrilla announced on her Instagram account that she was "no longer married." and starting a "new life path."

In 2020, Parrilla launched an online clothing company called Keep It Regal, where she sells apparel inspired by her role in Once Upon a Time.

Filmography

Film

Television

Awards and nominations

References

External links

 
 
 

1977 births
20th-century American actresses
21st-century American actresses
Actresses from New York City
American television actresses
American film actresses
American actresses of Puerto Rican descent
American people of Italian descent
American people of Puerto Rican descent
People of Sicilian descent
Fort Hamilton High School alumni
Hispanic and Latino American actresses
Living people
People from Boerum Hill, Brooklyn